Sabrina Moussaoui (born 25 March 1984) is an Algerian former footballer who played as a midfielder. She has been a member of the Algeria women's national team.

Club career
Moussaoui has played for Affak Relizane in Algeria.

International career
Moussaoui capped for Algeria at senior level during the 2010 African Women's Championship.

References

1984 births
Living people
Algerian women's footballers
Women's association football midfielders
Algeria women's international footballers
21st-century Algerian people